HMAS Magnetic is a former Royal Australian Navy (RAN) base located in Townsville, Queensland, Australia.

See also
List of former Royal Australian Navy bases

References

Royal Australian Navy bases
Military buildings and structures in Queensland